IRDA may refer to:

 Infrared Data Association, an interest group for developing infrared data communication protocols
 Insurance Regulatory and Development Authority, a government agency in India
 Intermittent rhythmic delta activity, a type of abnormal brain wave
 Iskandar Regional Development Authority, Malaysia
 International Reborn Doll Artists, a group promoting the making of reborn dolls
 Irda (Dragonlance), a fictional species in the Dragonlance series
 The Irda, a Dragonlance novel by Linda P. Baker